The Jerma or Erma is a river in southeastern Serbia and western Bulgaria. It is notable for passing the Serbian-Bulgarian border twice.

Course

Serbia 
The Jerma originates in the undeveloped and sparsely populated area of Krajište, in the southeastern corner of Serbia. This is where the Jerma crosses the border for the first time, at the border crossing of Strezimirovci.

Bulgaria 
Continuing through the Bulgarian part of Znepole curving around the eastern side of the Ruy mountain, the river, now called Erma, is also known as Transka reka after the town of Tran, a regional centre of this area. The Erma passes close to the villages of Glavanovtsi and Turokovtsi, where it turns north, running through Tran. After Tran, the Erma cut the famous gorge  ("Gorge of Tran"). After the gorge, Erma flows through the Bulgarian part of the village of Petačinci. Erma receives its major tributary, the Yablanitsa, right before it re-enters Serbia after a  travel through Bulgaria. The river crosses the border for the second time about  after Petačinci.

Returning to Serbia 
The Jerma continues to flow generally to the north, passing next to the village of Iskrovci and the spa of Zvonačka Banja. In this last section, the Jerma flows through the Sukovo coal basin, named after the village Sukovo, which is not on the banks of the Jerma itself, but slightly to the west. Despite the hard coal's high quality (7,000 cal), the coal mine near Pirot was shut down and coal is not being extracted anymore. In this final section, the Jerma is also known as Sukovska reka (Cyrillic: Суковска река; "river of Sukovo").

Characteristics 

During the January 2021 floods, the Jerma flooded the road in its valley and overflooded the riverbed of the Nišava. This caused the spilling of the Nišava, which flooded parts of Bela Palanka.

References

Sources 
 Mala Prosvetina Enciklopedija, Third edition (1985); Prosveta; 
 Jovan Đ. Marković (1990): Enciklopedijski geografski leksikon Jugoslavije; Svjetlost-Sarajevo; 

Rivers of Serbia
Rivers of Bulgaria
Landforms of Pernik Province
International rivers of Europe
Nature reserves in Serbia